Further changes occurred in the 1926 Isle of Man Tourist Trophy with the scrapping of the Side-Car TT and Ultra-Lightweight TT Races from the lack of entries. Most of the TT Course had now been tarmacked, including the Snaefell Mountain Section. Another change in 1926 was the ban on alcohol based fuels, forcing competitors to use road petrol. Despite these changes the prestige of the Isle of Man TT Races had encouraged the Italian motor-cycle manufacturers Bianchi, Garelli and Moto Guzzi to enter.

The 7 lap (264.11 miles) 1926 Junior TT race was won by Alec Bennett riding a 350 cc overhead-camshaft Velocette motor-cycle, in 3 hours, 57 minutes and 37 seconds, at an average speed of 66.70 mph.

The 1926 Lightweight TT Race produced one of the most notorious events in the history of the Isle of Man TT Races, described by "The Motor-Cycle" Magazine as the "Guzzi Incident." The Italian rider Pietro Ghersi was excluded from second place for using a different sparking-plug in the engine of his Moto Guzzi. Despite the competition from the Italian marques the 1926 Lightweight TT Race was won by 'Paddy' Johnston riding a Cotton motor-cycle, in 4 hours, 23 minutes and 16 seconds, at an average speed of 60.24 mph for the 7 lap race.

The 1926 Senior TT Race was less controversial and was won by Stanley Woods riding for Norton for the first-time by 4 minutes from Wal Handley. The 1926 Senior TT Race produced the first 70 mph (113 km/h) lap and was again set by Jimmie Simpson on an AJS motorcycle in 32 minutes and 9 seconds an average speed of 70.43 mph.

Senior TT (500 cc)

Junior TT (350 cc)

Lightweight TT (250 cc)

External links
 Detailed race results
 Isle of Man TT winners
 Mountain Course map

1926 in British motorsport
1926
Isle